Roman Kachanov may refer to:
Roman Abelevich Kachanov (1921–1993), a Russian animator (director, screenwriter, art director, animator)
Roman Romanovich Kachanov (born 1967), his son, Russian film director, screenwriter and actor

See also
 Kachanov